Palazzo Cesi may refer to:

Palazzo Cesi-Armellini in Rome, Via della Conciliazione
 in Rome, Via della Maschera d'Oro, headquarters of the Military Judiciary Council of Italy
Palazzo Muti-Cesi in Rome, Via del Gesù
Palazzo Cesi in Acquasparta, Italy